William Patrick Anderson (29 July 1910 – 5 February 1975) stood as an umpire in two cricket Test matches in 1961–62. He was born in England and died at Johannesburg, South Africa.

References

1910 births
1975 deaths
South African Test cricket umpires
British emigrants to South Africa
Place of birth missing